Macho Dancer is a 1988 Philippine film, directed by Lino Brocka. It explores the realities of a young, poor, rural gay man, who after being dumped by his American boyfriend, is forced to support himself and his family in Manila's seamy red-light district. The film's frank depiction of homosexuality, prostitution, drag queens and crooked cops, the porn industry, sexual slavery, and drugs and violence caused Filipino government censors to order extensive edits of the film. Brocka smuggled an uncensored cut out of the Philippines to be shown to a limited number of international film festivals. The film received a standing ovation at the 1988 Toronto International Film Festival. Macho Dancer was a box office failure in the Philippines due to its heavy censorship, but achieved international festival and critical success.

The smuggled, uncensored 35 mm print of the film is part of the permanent collection of the Museum of Modern Art in New York City.

Macho Dancer is one of the most influential gay films from the Philippines. The film is atypical of its genre in that its main protagonist kills a corrupt police officer without being charged for the crime.

Alan Paule and other actors playing 'macho dancers' were trained by a real macho dancer for three months.

In 2021 Joel Lamangan Directed the sequel "Anak ng Macho Dancer", which focuses on Inno, the son of Pol, portrayed by Sean De Guzman

Plot
Abandoned by his American lover who finished his tour of duty, Pol (Alan Paule) a poor, gay teenager from the mountains is forced to move to Manila and support himself and his family. He enters the underground world of male strippers, prostitution, illegal drugs, sexual exploitation, and sexual slavery. His closest friend is a successful "macho dancer" and call boy, Noel (Daniel Fernando) who takes Pol on as a roommate and acts as his mentor. Noel leads Pol to employment at Mama Charlie's, a male strip club in the district's tourist row frequented by American, European, and Japanese foreigners. Pol is quickly accepted into the community of sex workers and has an immediate rapport with Bambi, a young call girl that often parties on the street with Noel and his friends after work hours. 

After their camaraderie grows, Noel reveals to Pol that he initially moved to Manila to fund the education of his younger sister Pining and that she has recently gone missing. He left her with his aunt but fears that she ran away and has been kidnapped and sexually exploited. Pol promises Noel his complete support for the search.  

Desperate for extra money to fund his search for Pining, Noel takes on risky jobs. He solicits the jobs from Dennis, a fellow macho dancer with connections to the local crime lord, a corrupt police officer nicknamed Kid. Noel begins to deal drugs to his clients and asks Pol to appear with him in a pornographic film. During their time off, Pol and Noel search Manila's strip clubs and brothels for Pining. To aid their search, Bambi discreetly asks clients and sex workers about new groups of women forced into sexual slavery. 

Pol unwittingly receives a public beating from Kid that was meant for Dennis and Noel. Noel is nowhere to be found and Pol is taken in and nursed by Bambi. Pol declares that he is in love with her after they sleep together. Bambi brushes off his declaration and attributes it to his excitement at sleeping with a woman for the first time. Noel later expresses disappointment at their budding romance. 

Noel and Pol finally discover Pining being held as a sex slave at a brothel controlled by Kid's minions. The brothel is well guarded and considered extremely dangerous within the sex work community. They visit her disguised as clients. Pining tells them she came to Manila to flee her abusive aunt and find Noel. Lost and hungry, she accepted drugged food and was kidnapped, raped, and brought to the brothel. She is held in captivity there and is expected to service clients at all hours until she is released after about three years. She begs them to leave quickly to avoid suspicion. 

Noel despairs because there is no hope of freeing Pining without risking his own life. Having 'lost' Pol to Bambi in addition to the obstacles of Pining's rescue, he heavily indulges in drugs and alcohol with Dennis and other macho dancers. Pol comes back to the apartment to find some members of the group incapacitated and others engaging in self-harm with a razor and Dennis's .22 pistol. He intervenes and puts Noel to bed. 

After earning more money, Noel and Pol visit the brothel holding Pining again. They make an improvised escape and Kid pursues Noel, Pining, and Pol during a heavy rainstorm. Kid fatally shoots Noel, who dies in Pol's arms. Pol takes Pining to Bambi's apartment where she can remain hidden until he can arrange for her to leave the city. In mourning and weary from what has passed, he decides to return to the mountains and asks Bambi to come with him. She is tempted, but refuses to go on account of the fact that she has been doing sex work since age twelve and does not think she can do anything else.  

Before he leaves town, Pol packs up Noel's apartment and picks up the money saved for Pining. He then stalks Kid from dawn to dusk as the officer goes about his day. Careful not to be seen, Pol follows Kid back to his apartment complex. He shoots Kid in the head and quietly leaves the scene with no witnesses. On his last day in Manila, he visit's Mama Charlie's to say goodbye to his colleagues. The club has been raided and subsequently reopened under the new name Hijos. Although it has a new name, the club is same – same owner, workers, decor, and even the same macho dancer routines. A new corrupt police officer will act as the club's liaison with the law in the place of Kid, whose murder is on the front page of the newspapers. Though some of his friends ask him to reconsider, Pol is resolved to return to the country.  

He and Bambi see off Pining and give her the money that Noel saved for her education. Pol implores Bambi to come with him, but she still refuses. They part amicably, but sorrowfully. Pol boards the bus leaving Manila and smiles as it makes its way out of the city.

Cast
 Daniel Fernando as Noel
 Allan Paule as Pol
 Jaclyn Jose as Bambi
 William Lorenzo as Dennis
 Princess Punzalan as Pining
 Timothy Diwa as Rolly
 Angelo Miguel as Jun
 Johnny Vicar as Kid
 Lucita Soriano as The Mother
 Joel Lamangan as Mother
 Bobby Sano as Greg
 Charlie Catalla as Mama Charlie
 Anthony Taylor as The Manager
 Tony Mabesa as Customer 1
 Ronald Mendoza as Customer 2

Awards

Reviews
On Rotten Tomatoes, it has an average score of 78%, based on 81 views.

Kevin Thomas of L.A. Times in 1989 commented that the film is "very steamy both in gay and straight situations" and the "cast seems to be living rather than acting their roles".

References

External links 
 Manuel Ramos ´Images That Sweat, On the Spectacular Realism of Lino Brocka’s Macho Dancer´, Third Text - Critical Perspectives on Contemporary Art and Culture, 2022 https://www.tandfonline.com/doi/full/10.1080/09528822.2022.2131231?scroll=top&needAccess=true
 

1988 films
Tagalog-language films
Philippine LGBT-related films
Philippine dance films
LGBT-related drama films
1988 LGBT-related films
1988 drama films
Philippine drama films
Films directed by Lino Brocka